The International Genetically Engineered Machine (iGEM) competition is a worldwide synthetic biology competition that was initially aimed at undergraduate university students, but has since expanded to include divisions for high school students, entrepreneurs, and community laboratories, as well as 'overgraduates'.

Competition details 
Student teams are given a kit (so called ‘Distribution Kit’) of standard, interchangeable parts (so called 'BioBricks') at the beginning of the summer from the Registry of Standard Biological Parts comprising various genetic components such as promoters, terminators, reporter elements, and plasmid backbones. Working at their local laboratories over the summer, they use these parts and new parts of their own design to build biological systems and operate them in living cells.

The teams are free to choose a project, which can build on previous projects or be new to iGEM. Successful projects produce cells that exhibit new and unusual properties by engineering sets of multiple genes together with mechanisms to regulate their expression.

At the end of the summer, the teams add their new BioBricks to the Parts Registry and the scientific community can build upon the expanded set of BioBricks in the next year.

At the annual ‘iGEM Jamboree’ teams from all continents meet in Boston for a scientific conference where they present their projects to each other and to a scientific jury of ~120 judges. The judges are awarding medals, special prizes to the teams and select a ‘Grand Prize Winner’ team as well as ‘Runner-Up’ teams in each division (High School, Undergraduate and Overgraduate).

Awards & Judging in the iGEM competition 
Each participant receives a participating certificate (see fig. below) and has the possibility to earn medals (bronze, silver and gold; see fig. below) with their team depending on different criteria that the team fulfilled in the competitions. For a bronze medal it is for example necessary to submit a new part to the Parts Registry, for a silver medal the team is required to document the functionality of a part and for a gold medal it is finally, among other criteria, necessary to obtain a proof-of-principle for the team's project.

In 2016 as an example, 300 teams participated in the competition from which 37% received a gold medal, 25% a silver medal, 26% a bronze medal and 12% were not awarded a medal.

In each division, the best performance in a certain aspect of the competition is honored with special prizes. The special prizes include: 'Best Project' in the respective categories (app. 10 categories), 'Best Art & Design', 'Best Hardware', 'Best Measurement', 'Best Software', 'Best Human Practices', 'Best Model', 'Best New Part', 'Best Poster', 'Best Presentation', 'Best Wiki' and others depending on the competition year. Together with individual certificates, the teams are given glass trophies for each special prize (see fig. below).

From all teams in a respective division, a number of finalists are selected (1 to 6, depending on year and division) that are allowed to present their project again in front of all Jamboree participants. From the presented projects all judges select the winner of this year's iGEM competitions, the Grand Prize Winner-team that is awarded a big metal Lego-brick (see fig. below). The winning team may keep this challenge trophy for a year until it gets awarded to the next 'Grand Prize Winner'. Participants of a 'Grand Prize Winner'-team are also given challenge coins of the respective year (see fig. below).

History of the competition 

iGEM developed out of student projects conducted during MIT's Independent Activities Periods in 2003 and 2004. Later in 2004, a competition with five teams from various schools was held. In 2005, teams from outside the United States took part for the first time. Since then iGEM has continued to grow, with 130 teams entering in 2010.
Randy Rettberg, an engineer who has worked for technology companies including Apple, Sun and BBN, is the founder and director of the iGEM competition.

Because of this increasing size, in the years 2011 - 2013 the competition was split into three regions: Europe, the Americas, and Asia (though teams from Africa and Australia also entered via "Europe" and "Asia" respectively). Regional jamborees occurred during October; and some subset of teams attending those events were selected to advance to the World Championship at MIT in November.

In January 2012 the iGEM Foundation was spun out of MIT as an independent non-profit organization located in Cambridge, Massachusetts, USA. The iGEM Foundation supports scientific research and education through operating the iGEM competition. The same year, iGEM expanded into having not only the Collegiate division, but also competitions for entrepreneurs and high school students.

For their tenth anniversary, iGEM added new tracks to the existing ones: Art & Design, Community Labs, Entrepreneurship, Measurement, Microfluidics, Policy & Practice, and Software. Although Entrepreneurship and Software were tracks in previous years, in 2014 they were made more distinct in terms of their judging requirements. Furthermore, in 2014 iGEM did not have regional jamborees, but instead hosted a giant jamboree so every team could participate in one conference in Cambridge unlike in previous years where only the regional finalists were brought to Cambridge.

Broader goals 
Beyond just building biological systems, broader goals of iGEM include:
 To enable the systematic engineering of biology.
 To promote the open and transparent development of tools for engineering biology.
 And to help construct a society that can productively and safely apply biological technology.

iGEM's dual aspects of self-organization and imaginative manipulation of genetic material have demonstrated a new way to arouse student interest in modern biology and to develop their independent learning skills.

Competition Results

High School Division

Undergraduate Division

Overgraduate Division

Notes

References

Further reading

External links 

 iGEM
 Registry of Standard Biological Parts
 The BioBricks Foundation

Educational organizations based in the United States
Genetic engineering in the United States
Massachusetts Institute of Technology
Recurring events established in 2003
Synthetic biology